Houska is a surname. Notable people with the surname include:

Thomas Houška (born 2002),
British engineer 
David Houska (born 1993), Czech footballer
John Houska (born 1956), American soccer player
Jovanka Houska (born 1980), English chess player
Vincent Houška (1766–1840), Czech classical composer and musician